Claudia Riegler (born July 16, 1976, in Salzburg, Austria) is an alpine skier from Austria who competes in slalom skiing for New Zealand.

She has represented Austria in the 1994 Winter Olympics at Lillehammer, Norway; the 1998 Winter Olympics at Nagano, Japan; and the 2002 Winter Olympics at Salt Lake City, Utah.

She competed in Alpine skiing World Cup races from 1995 to 2003.

She is married to French alpine ski racer Antoine Dénériaz.

References

External links
 
 

1976 births
Living people
Austrian emigrants to New Zealand
Alpine skiers at the 1994 Winter Olympics
Alpine skiers at the 1998 Winter Olympics
Alpine skiers at the 2002 Winter Olympics
Olympic alpine skiers of New Zealand
New Zealand female alpine skiers
20th-century Austrian women